Oakley Hill is a historic plantation house located near Mechanicsville, Hanover County, Virginia. It was built about 1839 and expanded in the 1850s. It is a two-story, frame I-house dwelling in the Greek Revival style. On the rear of the house is a 1910 one-story ell. The house sits on a brick foundation, has a standing seam metal low gable roof, and interior end chimneys. The front facade features a one-story front porch with four Tuscan order columns and a Tuscan entablature. Also on the property are a contributing smokehouse and servants' house.

It was listed on the National Register of Historic Places in 1995.

References

Plantation houses in Virginia
Houses on the National Register of Historic Places in Virginia
Greek Revival houses in Virginia
Houses completed in 1839
Houses in Hanover County, Virginia
National Register of Historic Places in Hanover County, Virginia